Richard Betham is a Western Samoan former boxer who competed in the 1978 Commonwealth Games in Edmonton, Canada. He won bronze in the middleweight division after losing his semi-final bout to Philip McElwaine of Australia. In his first bout, Betham defeated Ansil Thomas of Guyana in a quarter-final contest.

Richard Betham is the younger brother of boxer Monty Betham.

References

Year of birth missing (living people)
Living people
Middleweight boxers
Samoan male boxers
Boxers at the 1978 Commonwealth Games
Commonwealth Games bronze medallists for Samoa
Commonwealth Games medallists in boxing
Medallists at the 1978 Commonwealth Games